Gattyana ciliata is a scale worm which occurs in the north-west Pacific Ocean from depths down to at least 240 m.

Description
Gattyana ciliata is a short-bodied worm with 37 segments and 15 pairs of elytra, which bear a marginal fringe of papillae. The lateral antennae are positioned ventrally on the prostomium, directly beneath the median antenna. Notochaetae are thinner than the  neurochaetae.

References

Phyllodocida